Sicily Township is one of twenty-four townships in Gage County, Nebraska, United States. The population was 185 at the 2020 census. A 2021 estimate placed the township's population at 185.

References

External links
City-Data.com

[icon] This Sicily Township, Gage County, Nebraska –related article is a stub. You can help Wikipedia by expanding it.

Townships in Gage County, Nebraska
Townships in Nebraska